Montenegro competed as an independent nation for the first time at the Olympic Games at the 2008 Summer Olympics in Beijing, People's Republic of China.  Montenegro was the youngest nation to participate in the 2008 Summer Olympics.
Athletes from Montenegro participated in three different events. In individual events, the new nation had representatives in boxing and shooting. Boxer Milorad Gajović represented his country in the heavyweight division, while Nikola Šaranović competed in 10 m air pistol and 50 m pistol precision shooting events.  In team competition, Montenegro competed in water polo.  The Montenegro national water polo team won the 2007 European Water Polo Olympic Qualification Tournament to qualify for the Olympic games.

Montenegro failed to win any medals, but did advance to the bronze medal match in men's water polo, where they lost to Serbia, 6-4.

History
Montenegro created its National Olympic Committee in 2006, and gained International Olympic Committee recognition in 2007 during the IOC's meetings in Guatemala City.  Previously, Montenegrin athletes competed as part of the Serbia and Montenegro team in 2004, and as part of Yugoslavia teams before that.  Montenegro was also part of the Yugoslavian team in the 1992 Summer Olympics that participated as the Independent Olympic Participants.  Following Montenegro's referendum to become a free nation, Serbia was declared the successor state and inherited the joint nation's National Olympic Committee. The admittance of Montenegro, along with Tuvalu and the Marshall Islands, brought the total number of nations that competed in the 2008 Olympics to 204.

Athletics

Men

Women

Boxing 

Milorad Gajović qualified in the heavyweight class at the second European continental qualifying tournament.

Judo

Shooting

Nikola Šaranović participated in the 2008 Summer Olympics in Beijing, China, at the age of 39. He ranked 40 in the Men's Air pistol 10 metres event. Šaranović also competed in the Men's Free Pistol 50 metres event, and ranked 44 overall. He did not earn any medals in the 2008 Summer Olympics, but went on to participate in both events again in the 2012 Summer Olympics in London.

Men

Swimming

Marina Kuč represented Montenegro in the 2008 Summer Olympics in Beijing, China. She ranked 31st in the preliminaries for the Women's 200m Breaststroke event with a finishing time of 2:31.24.

Women

Water polo

Men's tournament
The national team qualified as one of the twelve teams in the men's tournament by winning the European qualifying tournament in September 2007. The team finished in fourth place.

Roster

Group play

All times are China Standard Time (UTC+8).

Quarterfinal

Semifinal

Bronze medal game

References

Nations at the 2008 Summer Olympics
2008
Olympic Games